In Christianity, a family integrated church is one in which parents and children ordinarily attend church services together; during the service of worship, children and youth stay all through church services and do not attend children's and youth ministries during this time. Other terms used are family discipleship churches, family-centered ministry and inclusive-congregational ministry.

A spectrum of such churches exists, where some eliminate all age-segregation and others allow for some in certain contexts. Although segregation may take place during weekday events, family-integrated churches are generally united in having children in the main worship service on the Lord's Day. Timothy Paul Jones notes that in the family-integrated ministry model, "all age-graded classes and events are eliminated."  Family integrated churches emphasise inter-generational ministry and the "parents' responsibility to evangelize and disciple their own children." Some advocates base this on the idea that families are the "God-ordained building blocks of the church."

Adherents
Family-integrated churches can be found within many Christian denominations. Other denominations or associations, such as the Primitive Baptists and the Covenant Presbyterian Church  require family-integration of their churches. There are also parachurch organizations that work to promote family-integration and unite family-integrated churches, most notably Vision Forum and The National Center for Family Integrated Churches (NCFIC). These two organizations hosted a "Summit on Uniting Church and Home" in San Antonio, Texas, during September, 2001. The Summit discussed various issues, especially the "glaring dichotomy [that] still exists in those churches which practice unbiblical family-segregating, and teen-culture driven philosophies of church life." It is normative in Catholic and Lutheran churches for families to sit together during the offering of the Mass.
 
NCFIC is a parachurch organization, founded with the mission of promoting the sufficiency of scripture for church and family life and restoring family-integrated worship. The center works toward this goal by hosting conferences and connecting family-integrated churches around the world with their church directory which lists around 800 affiliated churches. Although they have a confession of faith that listed churches are required to agree with, affiliation with the NCFIC does not necessitate full agreement with the organization, only "substantial agreement." Furthermore, aside from their unity on family-integration, churches may vary widely in beliefs and adherents may vary greatly on issues regarding the practice of their faith.

Positions for and against family integration
In 2009, B&H Academic published Perspectives on Family Ministry: Three Views which included a contribution by Paul Renfro in favour of "Family-Integrated Ministry." Renfro argues that in the Old Testament, children were part of the "gathered assembly of God's people" (Deuteronomy ), while "in first-century churches the presence of children in the church assembly was assumed," since Paul directly addressed children in Ephesians . Scott Brown, a pastor and the director of the National Center of Family Integrated Churches, argues for family integrated churches on the basis of the sufficiency of Scripture,  while advocates of the concept also argue that this is the practice of historic Christianity. Ben Winslett, a Primitive Baptist and part of a church that requires family-integration, believes that family integrated worship builds family and better protects children from predators in the church, stating "So, what's my point? My point is that Christ's way is superior. It naturally removes the risk of incidents such as this. It builds stronger families and maintains a safer environment."

Andreas Köstenberger has stated that the movement elevates "the family to an unduly high status that is unwarranted in light of the biblical teaching on the subject".  In his book God, Marriage, and Family: Rebuilding the Biblical Foundation, he concludes that churches should devise ways to disciple members, including young people,  by instructing them in peer group settings, stating "using a peer group structure does not necessarily mean that the natural family structure is subverted but may helpfully complement and supplement it."<ref>Kostenberger, God, Marriage, and Family, p. 258.</ref>  R. C. Sproul Jr., himself an elder at a family-integrated church, commented in a July 2011 blog post that the family integrated church movement has "distorted priorities" and that some "would rather be in a family-integrated Mormon ‘church’ than a divided evangelical church."  Presbyterian pastor Shawn Mathis argued that the movement's rejection of age-segregation was biblically unfounded and contrary to historical facts. A chapter by Timothy Paul Jones in the book Navigating Student Ministry'' demonstrated that proponents of family-integrated ministry are historically in error when they claim that minister-led classes for children are a recent innovation that arose for pragmatic reasons; such classes existed for the purpose of catechetical instruction at least as early as the churches overseen by John Calvin in the city of Geneva. 

John B. Carpenter, noted eight objections to the FICM: (1)The sufficiency of scripture: that scripture doesn't explicitly teach it; (2) Divisiveness: noted by Mathis above; (3) Contradicts Scripture: that Titus 2 recommends just the sorts of age segregation the FIC condemns; (4) Undermines the Authority of the Offices in the church: that pastors are called to teach in churches, not fathers; (5) The FIC Misreads Church History: that there have been age-segregated movements from the early days of church history; (6) The FIC is a Cure for a Disease that's Not Prevalent: that what it objects to isn't a widespread problem; (7) Misdefinition of the Church: that the church consists of individual believers, not family units; (8) Familism: that it appears to make the family the ultimate loyalty.

References

External links
National Center for Family Integrated Churches
Family-Integrated Church Directory

Evangelical ecclesiology
Protestant worship and liturgy
Practical theology
Christian movements